The Croatian Anti-Aircraft Legion was an anti-aircraft (Flak) unit in the service of the German Air Force (Luftwaffe) during World War Two. It was composed of Croat volunteers from the Independent State of Croatia (NDH).

Background
Within days of Hitler's invasion of Russia, Croatian fascist Ante Pavelić, leader of the Independent State of Croatia (NDH) issued an appeal for Croats to fight on the side of Nazi Germany and join the volunteer Croatian Legion and its "crusade against Bolshevism", a regiment of infantry, two air units and one naval unit were sent to the Eastern Front.
In early 1943 an anti-aircraft (FLAK) unit of the Luftwaffe was formed on the model of the Croatian Air Force Legion. It numbered 350 gunners and about 3,000 support troops, the unit was commanded by Major Bojnik Srnec.

Operational history
After training took place in Germany, the unit was immediately sent to the Eastern Front, in total 350 men. The 350-strong unit led by Major Srnec did not serve long on the Eastern Front. In May 1944, after the fall of Crimea to the Soviet troops, and the destruction of the first Croatian Legion, the 369th (Croatian) Infantry Division, they were then returned to Croatia with the remnants of the Croatian Air Force Legion to defend their homeland that was threatened by Allied air attacks and guerrilla war.

After withdrawing from Crimea and then from Ukraine, personnel were reassigned to various Flak divisions and battalions throughout Western Europe, most of the legion followed 15./JG 52, one of two Croatian air squadrons raised for the Luftwaffe, back to Zagreb where it remained until the end of the war. Another group was assigned to Gem.Flak-Abt. 175 stationed in Mont de Marsan in France, an entirely Croatian unit. Another group was stationed near Münster and Munich. In the territory of NDH Croatia, only one Anti-aircraft unit of the Croatian Flak Legion served: Gem.Flak-Abt. 172 which was stationed near Zemun before being sent to East Prussia.
In late 1943 a second group was formed, trained in Germany and France in the vicinity of Auxerre and Bordeaux.

See also
 World War II in Yugoslavia
 Independent State of Croatia
 Croatian Air Force Legion
 Croatian Naval Legion

References

Military units and formations established in 1943
Military units and formations disestablished in 1945
Foreign volunteer units of the Wehrmacht
Military units and formations of the Luftwaffe
Independent State of Croatia
Military units and formations of Germany in Yugoslavia in World War II
Collaborators with Nazi Germany
Foreign volunteer units of the Luftwaffe
Military units and formations of the Croatian Legion